Extended Versions  is a live album by Humble Pie, released in 2000, as part of BMG's Encore Collection.  It has tracks taken from the King Biscuit Flower Hour Presents - Humble Pie In Concert, which was a 1996 release of a concert recorded on May 6, 1973 at San Francisco's Winterland Theatre. The only track not included here from that release is "I Don't Need No Doctor".

Track listing

Band
Steve Marriott - Guitar, vocals
Clem Clempson - Guitar, backing vocals
Greg Ridley - Bass guitar, vocals
Jerry Shirley - Drums

References

Humble Pie (band) albums
2000 compilation albums
2000 live albums